Panenka may refer to:

Surname
 Antonín Panenka (born 1948), a footballer from Czechoslovakia
 Panenka (penalty kick), the kick named after him
 Jan Panenka (1922–1999), a Czech pianist

Other
 Panenka (bivalve), a genus of fossil bivalves in the family Antipleuridae